Charles "Hooks" Beverly (May 6, 1899 – March, 1981) was an American baseball pitcher in the Negro leagues. He played from 1925 to 1936 with several teams.

References

External links
 and Baseball-Reference Black Baseball stats and Seamheads

1899 births
1981 deaths
Newark Eagles players
Birmingham Black Barons players
Philadelphia Stars players
Kansas City Monarchs players
Pittsburgh Crawfords players
Baseball players from Houston
20th-century African-American sportspeople
Baseball pitchers